LYRa11 is a SARS-like coronavirus (SL-COV) which was identified in 2011 in samples of intermediate horseshoe bats in Baoshan, Yunnan, China. The genome of this virus strain is 29805nt long, and the similarity to the whole genome sequence of SARS-CoV that caused the SARS outbreak is 91%. It was published in 2014. Like SARS-CoV and SARS-CoV-2, LYRa11 virus uses ACE2 as a receptor for infecting cells.

Phylogenetic

See also 
 Bat coronavirus RaTG13

References

References 
 

Bat virome
SARS-related coronavirus
Infraspecific virus taxa